The Ethiopian Women's Premier League (Amharic: የሴቶች ፕሪምየር ሊግ) is the top Women's association football league in Ethiopia. It is regulated by the Ethiopian Football Federation and divided into two division, division 1 (the top division) and division 2 ( the second division).

History 
The league was founded in 2012 (2005 E.C.).

Dedebit won their 2nd title in the 2015-16 season. Ethiopia Nigd Bank's striker Shitaye Sisay won the 2015-16 Most Valuable Player award. Loza Abera was top goal scorer at season's end with 10 goals in the playoffs and 47 goals during season competition.

Dedebit won its 3rd title in the 2016-17 season. After the 2016-17 season the first division was split into two divisions with the inaugural season of the Women's second division league set for the 2017-18 season.

The format of the league for the 2016-17 season had 20 teams in two groups (10 teams per group) with group winners fighting for the trophy at the end of the season. The 20 clubs that participated were a record high since the establishment of the league.

Dedebit were crowned champions for a third straight year earning the club's 4th title overall in its history. The Dedebit Women's team was disbanded the after 2017-18 season due to the club's financial problems.

Adama City won the 2018-19 league title, its first as a club. In 2021, Nigd Bank secured its fourth championship in the team's history, first since 2015, by virtue of 2-1 victory over Adama City. The 2020-21 second division was won by Bahir Dar Kenema, qualifying the team for the next season's first division competition. CBE FC won the first division title in the 2020-21 season.

Clubs

Division 1 
The following 11 clubs competed in the Ethiopian Women's Premier League (Division 1) during the 2020-21 Season.

Division 2 
The following 8 clubs competed in the Ethiopian Premier League (Division 2) during the 2020-21 Season.

Previous Winners (First Division) 

 2015-16: Dedebit (Addis Abeba)
 2016-17: Dedebit (Addis Abeba)
 2017-18: Dedebit (Addis Abeba) 
 2018-19: Adama City (Adama) 
2019-20: Season Cancelled 
2020-21: CBE FC
2021-22: CBE FC

Top Goal Scorer (First Division) 

*including playoff goals

References 

Women's association football leagues in Africa
Football leagues in Ethiopia
Women's football in Ethiopia